Brithdir is a small hamlet on the outskirts of Dolgellau, Gwynedd in the community of Brithdir and Llanfachreth.

The Arts and Crafts Movement St Mark's Church is a Grade I listed building in the care of the Friends of Friendless Churches.  Brithdir also includes a village hall, a phone box and a children's nursery.

References

Villages in Gwynedd
Brithdir and Llanfachreth
Villages in Snowdonia